Jaunpuri may refer to:

 Jaunpuri (raga), in Indian classical music
 Jaunpuri dialect (Garhwal), a dialect of Garhwali spoken in Jaunpur, Uttarakhand
 a dialect of Bhojpuri, spoken in Jaunpur, Uttar Pradesh
 of or related to Jaunpur

People with the name
 Muhammad Jaunpuri (1443–1505), Sufi saint and Mahdi claimant
 Mulla Mahmud Jaunpuri (1606–1651), natural philosopher
 Karamat Ali Jaunpuri (1800-1873), Islamic scholar
 Hafiz Ahmad Jaunpuri (1834-1899), Islamic scholar
 Abdul Awwal Jaunpuri (1867–1921), Islamic scholar
 Abdur Rab Jaunpuri (1875–1935), Islamic scholar
 Majid Ali Jaunpuri (died 1935), Islamic scholar
 Syed Rashid Ahmed Jaunpuri (1889–2001), Sufi saint
 Muhammad Yunus Jaunpuri (1937–2017), Islamic scholar

See also